Cleyton Rafael Lima da Silva (born 24 February 1990), simply known as Cleyton, is a Brazilian footballer playing for Botafogo-PB, on loan from Operário Ferroviário, as a midfielder.

Club career
Cleyton played for Iraty in his native Brazil between 2011 and 2012, where he made 35 appearances. Cleyton then moved to Académica in the Portuguese Primeira Liga in 2012, signing a two-year contract.

In July 2014, Cleyton moved to FC Tyumen of the Russian National Football League on a season-long loan deal.

On 27 November 2017, Cleyton signed for Operário.

Career statistics

References

External links

1990 births
Living people
Association football midfielders
Brazilian footballers
Primeira Liga players
Campeonato Brasileiro Série C players
Campeonato Paranaense players
Brazilian expatriate footballers
Expatriate footballers in Russia
Iraty Sport Club players
Associação Académica de Coimbra – O.A.F. players
FC Tyumen players
Centro Sportivo Alagoano players
Paysandu Sport Club players
Botafogo Futebol Clube (PB) players
Sportspeople from Mato Grosso do Sul